The Kaladongar Formation is the oldest Mesozoic geologic formation of the Kachchh basin. It is found in Patcham Island, Kachchh, Gujarat, India. It is made up of limestone and sandstone. It was later intruded by an olivine gabbroic intrusion which baked and shattered the overlying Limestone. Dinosaur remains are among the fossils that have been recovered from the formation, although none have yet been referred to a specific genus.

See also

 List of dinosaur-bearing rock formations
 List of stratigraphic units with indeterminate dinosaur fossils

Footnotes

References
 Weishampel, David B.; Dodson, Peter; and Osmólska, Halszka (eds.): The Dinosauria, 2nd, Berkeley: University of California Press. 861 pp. .

Mesozoic Erathem of Asia
Geologic formations of India